Theophil Mitchell Prudden (1849 – April 10, 1924) was an American pathologist, born in Middlebury, Connecticut.  He graduated from the Sheffield Scientific School, Yale, in 1872 and received his M. D. from Yale School of Medicine in 1875.  He became an assistant (1879) and was professor of pathology (1892-1909) in the College of Physicians and Surgeons, Columbia University.  In 1901 he was made a director of the Rockefeller Institute for medical research.

He died at his home in New York on April 10, 1924.

Books  
 A Manual of Normal Histology (1881)
 A Handbook of Pathological Anatomy and Histology (1885; ninth edition, 1911), with F. Delafield
 Story of the Bacteria (1889)
 Dust and its Dangers (1891)
 Drinking Water and Ice Supplies (1891)
 On the Great American Plateau

References

Attribution

External links
 
 Theophil Mitchell Prudden Papers (MS 1051). Manuscripts and Archives, Yale University Library.

American pathologists
American science writers
Yale University alumni
Columbia University faculty
People from Middlebury, Connecticut
1849 births
1924 deaths
Rockefeller University faculty